Katarzyna Jankowska ( Katarzyna Rutkowska, born 14 January 1994) is a Polish long-distance runner. In 2020, she competed in the women's half marathon at the 2020 World Athletics Half Marathon Championships held in Gdynia, Poland.

In 2019, she competed in the women's 5000 metres at the 2019 Summer Universiade held in Naples, Italy. She finished in 5th place in the final.

References

External links 
 

Living people
1994 births
Place of birth missing (living people)
Polish female long-distance runners
Competitors at the 2019 Summer Universiade
20th-century Polish women
21st-century Polish women